The General Theological Seminary of the Episcopal Church (GTS) is an Episcopal seminary in New York City. Founded in 1817, GTS is the oldest seminary of the Episcopal Church and the longest continuously operating Seminary in the Anglican Communion.  The seminary was chartered by an act of the Episcopal Church's General Convention and its name was chosen to reflect its founders' vision that it be a seminary to serve the whole Church.  In 2022 the Seminary entered into a formal affiliation with Virginia Theological Seminary, whereby the two separate institutions share a common leadership structure.

History

Founding
In May 1817 General Convention, the governing body of the Episcopal Church, met in New York City and passed two resolutions:  first, to found a general Episcopal seminary to be supported by the whole church; second, that it be located in New York City. This was emended in 1820 to remove the school to New Haven, Connecticut, but in 1821 the will of Trinity Church vestry member Jacob Sherred unexpectedly heeded the words of his friend John Pintard and directed that his entire fortune of around $60,000 should be paid when:

... there shall be established within the state of New-York, under the direction or by the authority of the General Convention of the Protestant Episcopal Church in the United States of America, or of the Convention of the Protestant Episcopal Church in the State of New-York, a College, Academy, School, or Seminary, for the education of young men designed for holy orders in the Protestant Episcopal Church.

The newly established diocesan school in New York expected to be the beneficiary and Bishop Hobart published his thanks for the gift in the April 4 New York Evening Post, since the General Seminary had already begun its 1820 term in Connecticut. A special convocation of the bishops was hastily arranged, however, and it was agreed to return the school to New York City in order to claim Sherred's grant, although the Virginia deputies continued to bemoan that the seminary should be "placed under more favorable auspices for the promotion of what we [believe] to be sound views of the Gospel and the Church than it would be in New York". Duncan Cameron mollified them and convinced one to note that "the evil of the undue influence of New York in the General Seminary ... would be chiefly at the beginning, and would be decreasing every year". With some stipulations concerning its governance, Bishop Hobart consented to the union of the diocesan school with the General Seminary rather than contesting the inheritance.  The unified school opened for the spring term of 1822.

Other parishioners of Trinity Church went on to support the once more local institution. Clement Clarke Moore, famous for penning A Visit from St. Nicholas, owned the estate "Chelsea", which included most of what would become the Manhattan neighborhood by that name.  Also a member of Trinity Church, he donated 66 tracts of land—which was his apple orchard—to become the site of the new seminary.  It was not, however, until 1827 that the seminary occupied that land.

Other figures influential in the founding of the seminary include Theodore Dehon, William White, and John Henry Hobart.  Bishop Hobart served as the seminary's first dean, after which the Bishop of New York served in this capacity until the 1850s.

19th century
In 1878, Eugene Augustus Hoffman – said to be the richest clergyman in the world due to his extensive real estate holdings – was appointed dean.  Under his tenure, the seminary saw tremendous growth, both in student body and facilities.  Dean Hoffman's "grand design" was for the seminary's Chelsea campus to be built on an Oxford model, with neo-Gothic buildings facing onto a central quadrangle or Close.  Likely Dean Hoffman's most influential addition to the seminary's campus was the Chapel of the Good Shepherd which was begun in 1886, completed two years later, and became known as the "Jewel of Chelsea Square."  Its set of 15 tubular bells is the oldest extant in this country, with tubes by John Harrington of Coventry, England; original installation (1888) by Walter Durfee of Providence, Rhode Island; and a modern baton clavier (1983) by Royal Eijsbouts of Asten, Netherlands.  The tower chime is played daily by members of the seminary's Guild of Chimers to call the community to worship. Architect Charles C. Haight designed and supervised construction of most of the buildings on Chelsea Square while Haight's father, Benjamin I. Haight, was the first priest at nearby St. Peter's Episcopal Church.

Due to growing housing needs for married students, GTS acquired 422 West 20th Street, a residential building opposite the seminary's 20th Street gate in March 1957.

Early 2000s

A renovation and expansion of the seminary's buildings facing 10th Avenue was completed in 2007, when the Desmond Tutu Center opened. Named for Desmond Tutu, former visiting professor at GTS and retired archbishop of the Church of the Province of Southern Africa, the Tutu Center operates primarily as a hotel and conference center.

In 2007 the seminary engaged in an effort to reduce its carbon footprint, along with general operating costs, by converting many of its buildings to geothermal heating and cooling.

Also in 2007, the seminary, in need of funds, sold Sherrill Hall, a 1960s building along 9th Ave to the Brodsky Organization for the construction of a residential condominium building.  The Chelsea Enclave was completed in 2010 and contains 53 residential units as well as retail space, an underground parking garage, and the seminary's new Keller Library. The seminary's main entrance is now located on 21st Street between 9th and 10th Avenues.

Still facing financial difficulties, General Theological Seminary is currently engaged in its Plan to Choose Life, a strategic initiative which necessitates the sale of several properties: 422 West 20th Street, the Chelsea 2,3,4 building, and the West Building.  Assets from the sales are expected to eliminate the seminary's debt, rebuild its depleted endowment, and restore it to financial solvency.

2014
In September 2014, eight of the seminary's ten full-time faculty announced their intention to unionize and announced their intention to absent themselves from teaching and worship, alleging harassment and bullying behavior on the part of Dean Kurt Dunkle. In a letter to the Board of Trustees on September 17, the eight faculty alleged that Dunkle had repeatedly made racist, sexist, and homophobic remarks; made unprofessional comments about faculty members to their colleagues; compromised the confidentiality of student records; and responded to staff who complained of his behavior by threatening their jobs. The protesting faculty warned that unless the Board agreed to meet to discuss the allegations, the eight would be obliged to absent themselves from teaching, meetings, and worship.

The Board of Trustees of the seminary treated the letter as a mass resignation, which it accepted on September 29. The faculty contested this characterization, noting that no resignations were tendered, and published the details of their grievances online, including the original September 17 letter.

The news quickly became a national issue widely reported on within religious circles.  A previously arranged series of lectures by a visiting theologian from Duke had to be canceled when he declined to attend, citing the controversy roiling the seminary.  Around the same time an online petition was established supporting the faculty, with hundreds of co-signers including theologians from all over the country who pledged not to speak at GTS until the terminated faculty were reinstated.

2020s
During the COVID-19 pandemic, like most other institutions of higher learning, the Seminary quickly pivoted to a hybrid learning model which - for the first time in the Seminary's history - enabled seminary faculty and students to engage in a structure program and education, formation, and training in their home contexts.  The program, initially begun in response to the pandemic, helped the Seminary to identify a need within the Church for a high-quality, low-residency, accredited MDiv program.  In 2021, the Board of Trustees authorized the Seminary to launch a fully hybrid MDiv program, which welcomed its first cohort of students in 2022.  

At the same time, under the leadership of Acting Dean and President Michael W. DeLashmutt, the Seminary Board entered into a formal process, aimed at assessing the Seminary's long-term financial and operational model.  Through the  "Strategic and Faithful Partnerships" the Trustees of General Seminary the need for the Seminary to engage in a substantial partnership with another institution, in order to secure the mission and legacy of the School.  In 2022 this led to the establishment of a formal Affiliation Agreement between General Seminary and Virginia Theological Seminary.  While remaining separate institutions, the two Seminaries now share a common leadership structure and support services.

Academics
The mission of the General Theological Seminary is to "educate and form leaders for the church in a changing world."  GTS does this chiefly through its Master of Divinity program, which prepares persons for ordination, primarily in the Episcopal Church.  The M.Div. requires a foundation curriculum in Old Testament, New Testament, church history, systematic theology, ethics, ascetical theology, liturgics, homiletics, and pastoral theology.  Elective courses allow students to more deeply explore areas of particular interest and, if studying full-time, the Master of Divinity is generally completed in three years.

Since 1880 the General Theological Seminary has annually hosted the Paddock Lectures, which were founded by benefactor George A. Jarvis and named in honor of Benjamin Henry Paddock (Class of 1852 and Bishop of Massachusetts). The lectures have featured many of the world's leading theologians including Francis Joseph Hall, Diogenes Allen, William Temple, and Rowan Williams.

The seminary has been accredited by the Association of Theological Schools in the United States and Canada since 1938.

Library
According to Niels Henry Sonne, "The Library of The General Theological Seminary is a magnificent treasury of books, manuscripts, records and source materials for the study of the life and thought of Christianity." The library's first donation was by John Pintard in 1820 and, within a year, the library had grown to over 2,500 volumes. J. H. Feltus was the first librarian and, in 1834, the Friends of the Library association was formed and their endowment is still productive today. Under the direction of Eugene Augustus Hoffman, who became dean in 1879, the library was classified and catalogued using modern systems and Hobart Hall was built to house the collection. Hoffman also bought the Walter A. Copinger collection of Latin Bibles and made other significant purchases.

The library has a collection of ancient Bibles and English Bibles. The Ancient Bible Collection includes a Hebrew Bible from 1264, in which the comment was so written as to form decorative pictures. It also includes three tenth-century Gospels, one decorated with colored miniatures, and a complete Latin Bible from about 1250.  The library once had a Gutenberg Bible. "The General Theological Seminary copy was acquired in 1898 when the Offenburg-Syston Park-Makellar copy came up for auction." One of the pages of this copy was found to have been forged and was replaced with another page from another incomplete Gutenberg Bible, making this the first incomplete Gutenberg Bible to be made whole again.  In 1978, this copy was sold for $2.2 million to the Württembergische Landesbibliothek in Stuttgart, Germany.

The library of the General Theological Seminary has been known as the St. Mark's Library since the 1960s. In 2011, the library moved into a new facility on the east side of the Close, on the site of the former Sherrill Hall. In October 2011, the building was dedicated as the Christoph Keller, Jr. Library, to honor the tenth Bishop of Arkansas.

Campus
Located on the west side of Manhattan in New York City, the General Theological Seminary sits in the heart of Chelsea, a largely residential area with a large gay population that is known as a center of the New York art world, with over 200 galleries in the neighborhood.  Chelsea Square, the block between 9th and 10th Avenues and 20th and 21st Streets on which the seminary sits, is at the center of the Chelsea Historic District, which is listed on the National Register of Historic Places.  The seminary is frequently noted for the beauty of the gardens on its campus, called the Close, an English term used to refer to a private piece of enclosed property and often associated with cathedrals.  The seminary's Close is characterized by a row of neo-Gothic buildings along 21st Street and tree-shaded lawns uncharacteristic of its urban setting.

Worship

Worship is at the center of seminary life and the community gathers several times throughout the day for worship in the centrally located Chapel of the Good Shepherd.

People

Because it has formed many of the church's clergy, GTS has maintained a considerable influence on the life of the church.

Notable former professors include J. Robert Wright the St. Mark's in the Bowery Professor of Ecclesiastical History and David Hurd the Professor of Church Music and Organist of the Chapel of the Good Shepherd.

Notable alumni include:
James Lloyd Breck, a co-founder of Nashotah House and the founder of Seabury Divinity School 
Jeannette Piccard, one of the "Philadelphia Eleven" who were the first women to be ordained in the Episcopal Church
Gene Robinson, ninth Bishop of New Hampshire and first openly gay bishop in the Episcopal Church
Frank T. Griswold, 25th Presiding Bishop of the Episcopal Church from 1998 to 2006.

Many other notable figures, including a number of bishops, have graduated from the seminary.

In popular culture

Because of its proximity to film studios in New York City and its collection of neo-Gothic buildings, GTS has appeared in multiple television shows to portray a number of schools and universities.  Only a block from the Chelsea Piers, where Law & Order, Law & Order: Criminal Intent were filmed and where Law & Order: SVU and The Blacklist are currently filmed, the seminary's Close has frequently appeared in those shows as a stand-in for several schools whose campuses are not as accessible and most frequently as the fictitious Hudson University.

Gallery

See also

References
Notes

Bibliography
 Berner, Nancy and Lowry, Susan.  Garden Guide: New York City.  New York: W.W. Norton & Company, Inc., 2002. 
 Boggs, Timothy A, Bruce Parker, and Sam Waterson. Through the Gates into the City: a Metropolis, a Seminary, and a Chapel. New York: The General Theological Seminary of the Episcopal Church, 2007.
 Burrows, Edwin G, and Mike Wallace. Gotham: A History of New York City to 1898. New York: Oxford University Press, 1999. 
 .
 Sonne, Niels H. America's Oldest Episcopal Seminary Library and the Needs It Serves. New York?: General Theological Seminary, 1953.
 St. Mark's Library (General Theological Seminary). The Gutenberg Bible of the General Theological Seminary. New York: St. Mark's Library, the General Theological Seminary, 1963.

External links

 Official website
 

 
Episcopal Church (United States)
Seminaries and theological colleges in New York City
Seminaries and theological colleges in Connecticut
Anglican seminaries and theological colleges
Universities and colleges in New York City
Educational institutions established in 1817
Educational institutions established in 1820
Educational institutions established in 1822
Episcopal Church in New York (state)
Episcopal Church in Connecticut
Universities and colleges in Manhattan
Universities and colleges in New Haven County, Connecticut
Chelsea, Manhattan
1822 establishments in New York (state)